Cinesite Animation is a production and service animation studio based in Montreal, Quebec. It is part of Cinesite Studios, along with its partner company Cinesite VFX.

Cinesite officially announced the launch of its dedicated feature animation division on February 8, 2016.  In March 2017 the Cinesite group acquired Vancouver-based animation studio Nitrogen Studios. In July 2022, the studio acquired Canadian animation studio L'Atelier Animation. In August 2022, it purchased a majority stake in Canadian animation studio Squeeze.

The company is currently in development on a slate of nine animated films, scheduled to be in production by 2020, in addition to service work for 3QU Media and Sony Pictures Animation.

Feature films and shorts 
The first of nine films announced as in development by Cinesite Animation are Harold Lloyd and Riverdance.  The first, Harold Lloyd, in partnership with the Harold Lloyd Estate, is currently in pre-production and will be co-produced with Aniventure.  An animated feature inspired by the stage show Riverdance is also in development, with Ireland's River Productions.

Cinesite Animation also has a slate deal with 3QU Media, to create several animated feature films. The first, Gnome Alone, directed by Peter Lepeniotis, which was released in 2018, after being delayed from 2017, with Charming starring Demi Lovato released in the same year.  Cinesite also animated seasonal production The Star for Sony, released in November 2017.

In December 2013, Cinesite released "Beans", to showcase its creature animation skills. The 30-second animation went viral, amassing over 14 million views on YouTube and earning the opening slot in the 2014 SIGGRAPH Electronic Theatre. The animated short also won a gold award at the AEAF animation awards.

Growth in Canada 

In January 2014, with the support of Investissement Québec, Cinesite announced the opening of its studios in Montréal. Its initial employment target was reached 18 months early, in August 2015.  On February 8, 2016, the opening of Cinesite's Animation division was announced in Montréal, Canada.  The company subsequently announced its acquisition of Vancouver-based animation studio Nitrogen Studios in March 2017.

On February 8, 2016, Cinesite Animation announced the launch of Animate Montreal (Animez Montréal). The initiative, founded by Cinesite partnered with a group of associated companies, aims to help with upskilling, training and filling experience gaps, supporting the growth of the emerging Montréal animated film industry.

Filmography

References

Canadian animation studios
Companies based in Montreal
Cinema of Quebec